The Indianapolis mayoral election of 1987 took place on November 3, 1987, and saw the reelection of Republican William H. Hudnut III to a fourth term.

Hundut defeated Democratic nominee J. Bradford Senden, a self-employed political consultant.

Results

References

1987
1987 United States mayoral elections
1987 Indiana elections